Aquaculture International is an international bi-monthly scientific journal on the subject of aquaculture and the official journal of the European Aquaculture Society. It is published by Springer. Publication began in 1993. The name is conventionally abbreviated "Aquac Int".

The current Editor in Chief and Main Editor, as of March 01 2020, was Gavin M. Burnell. In 2019, it had an Impact Factor of 1.363.

References

Aquaculture
Springer Science+Business Media academic journals
Publications established in 1993
Bimonthly journals
Agricultural journals